Sunshine Special may refer to:
 Sunshine Special (automobile), the presidential limousine used by Franklin D. Roosevelt.
 Sunshine Special, the former flagship of Missouri Pacific Railroad's passenger train service.